Mount Alava is a mountain in the National Park of American Samoa, on the volcanic island of Tutuila. Its summit has an elevation of 491m. The summit of the mountain can be reached via the Mount Alava Trail.

The mountain overlooks Pago Pago Harbor.

References 

Mountains of American Samoa